Sir James Burrow  (28 November 1701 – 5 November 1782 at Starborough Castle, Lingfield, Surrey), was a legal reporter at Inner Temple, London, and was vice president and twice briefly president of the Royal Society. He was knighted in 1773.

He was elected a Fellow of the Royal Society on 7 April 1737, as "A Gentleman well versed in Natural and Mathematical knowledge". He served as a member of the Royal Society Council from 1752 until 1782, initially as a vice president from 1752, and then as a council member. He twice served briefly as a president of the Royal Society, from October to November 1768 following the death of The Earl of Morton, and July to November 1772, following the death of James West.

As vice president, he was involved in the society's activities in organising the observation of the 1761 Transit of Venus, signing the Articles of Agreement between the Council of the Royal Society and Mr Charles Mason and Mr Jeremiah Dixon for their expedition to Bencoolen in the Island of Sumatra.

As a legal reporter, he wrote and published reports of the decisions of significant cases in the English legal system. His work is still cited in law courses.

Publications
 James Burrow, 1732, The Decisions of King's Bench upon Settlement Cases from the Death of Lord Raymond. London.
 James Burrow. 1757. Serious Reflections on the Present State of Domestic and Foreign Affairs ... together with some critical remarks on lotteries, etc. London.
 James Burrow. 1763. A few Anecdotes and Observations relating to Oliver Cromwell and his family; serving to rectify several errors concerning him, published by N. C. Padopoli in his Historia Gymnasii Patavini. London.
 Sir James Burrow. 1771. De usu et ratione interpungendi: an essay on the use of pointing, and the facility of practising it. J. Worrall & B. Tovey: London. 
 Sir James Burrow. 1772. Reports of Cases Argued and Adjudged in the Court of King's Bench: During the Time Lord Mansfield Presided in That Court; from Michaelmas Term, 30 Geo. II. 1756, to Easter Term, 12 Geo. III. London.

See also
 List of presidents of the Royal Society

References
 Record of Election Certificate, reference EC/1737/02, from the Royal Society Archive Catalogue, accessed via  17 December 2005
 Record of James Burrow in the Royal Society Fellows Catalogue. accessed via   17 December 2005
 British Library record for author James Burrow, retrieved 17 December 2005

External links
Portrait of James Burrow by James Basire, from the collection of the Fine Arts Museums of San Francisco
 Courtney, W. P. Burrow, Sir James (1701–1782). Oxford Dictionary of National Biography, Online ed., January 2008. (accessed November 28, 2010)

1701 births
1782 deaths
Fellows of the Royal Society
Presidents of the Royal Society
Fellows of the Society of Antiquaries of London